Matthew Shir (born 12 September 1981) is an Australian rules footballer who played with the Adelaide Football Club in the Australian Football League (AFL).

Shir, a defender, was drafted by Adelaide from the Murray Bushrangers of the TAC Cup, although he was from Benalla originally. He was hampered by groin injuries during his time in Adelaide. At SANFL level he played for Glenelg.

Richmond secured him in the 2002 Rookie Draft, but he did not make any senior league appearances.

From 2004 to 2009 he played as a midfielder for Wodonga in the Ovens & Murray Football League. He won three club best and fairest awards and was a member of a premiership team in his first season, winning the O&MFL medal for best on ground in the grand final.

He made his way to Queensland in 2010 to play with Aspley.

References

1981 births
Australian rules footballers from Victoria (Australia)
Adelaide Football Club players
Glenelg Football Club players
Aspley Football Club players
Wodonga Football Club players
Benalla Football Club players
Living people